The Ebu Bekër Mosque is a mosque in Shkodër City, Shkodër County, Albania.

The mosque was designed by ARC Architectural Consultants and built from 1994 to 1995 on the site of the old Fushë Çela Mosque, which was destroyed during the communist era, with funding from Saudi entrepreneur Sheikh Zamil Abdullah Al-Zamil. It is named after Abu Bakr, the first Rashidun caliph. The inauguration was held on 27 October 1995, and the mosque was renovated in 2008.

The Fushë Çela mosque was historically important in the scholarly learning of the city and attracted notable Islamic scholars and theologians. A legacy of the Ottoman Empire destroyed by the People's Socialist Republic of Albania, it once had its own madrasa.

Gallery

See also
 Islam in Albania

References

Further reading

 Anamali, Skënder; Prifti, Kristaq (2002). Historia e popullit shqiptar: vëllimi i parë. Tiranë: Toena. .

Ottoman architecture in Albania
Mosques in Shkodër
Buildings and structures in Shkodër
Sufi tekkes in Albania